Harb is an Arabic surname that may refer to the following people:
Abu Sufyan ibn Harb (560–650), son of the 7th century Arabian Meccan leader Harb ibn Umayya, and leader of the Quraysh of Mecca
Ahmad ibn Harb (died 234), Iranian Sufi, traditionist and a fighter in the holy wars
Benjamín Miguel Harb (1926–2008), Bolivian politician and lawyer 
Boutros Harb (born 1944), Lebanese politician 
Chucrallah Harb (1923–2019), Lebanese Hierarch of Maronite Church 
Fred Harb (1930–2016), American stock car racing driver 
Harith ibn Harb, son of the 7th century Arabian Meccan leader Harb ibn Umayya, brother of Abu Sufyan ibn Harb
Helen Hicks Harb (1911–1974), American golfer 
Janan Harb (born 1947), wife of King Fahd of Saudi Arabia 
Joseph Harb (1940–2014), Lebanese poet and writer 
Mac Harb (born 1953), Canadian parliamentarian 
Mehdi Harb (born 1979), Tunisian football player
Nabil Abou-Harb (born 1984), Arab-American filmmaker, writer, producer, and director 
Ragheb Harb (1952–1984), Lebanese resistance leader and Muslim cleric 
Ramez Harb (died 2012), Palestinian militant 
Talaat Harb (1867–1941), Egyptian economist 
Tanios Harb (born 1925), Lebanese sports shooter 
Wahshi ibn Harb, companion of the Islamic prophet Muhammad
Zaid Al-Harb (1887–1972), Kuwaiti poet 

Arabic-language surnames